The 1947 Tennessee Volunteers (variously Tennessee, UT, or the Vols) represented the University of Tennessee in the 1947 college football season. Playing as a member of the Southeastern Conference (SEC), the team was led by head coach Robert Neyland, in his 16th year, and played their home games at Shields–Watkins Field in Knoxville, Tennessee. They finished the season with a record of five wins and five losses (5–5 overall, 2–3 in the SEC).

Schedule

Team players drafted into the NFL

References

Tennessee
Tennessee Volunteers football seasons
Tennessee Volunteers football